Craiglockhart Primary School is a primary school in the Shandon area of Edinburgh. The school buildings are in the Victorian style of architecture.

History
The school was built in 1901 after a design by architects Robert Wilson and John Alexander Carfrae. It has been designated as a Category B listed building by Historic Scotland.

References

External links
Official School Website
HMIE Inspection Report

Primary schools in Edinburgh
Educational institutions established in 1901
Category B listed buildings in Edinburgh
Listed schools in Scotland
1901 establishments in Scotland
School buildings completed in 1901